Tang Ravaq (also Romanized as Tang-e Ravāq and Tang Ravāq) is a village in Pataveh Rural District, Pataveh District, Dana County, Kohgiluyeh and Boyer-Ahmad Province, Iran. At the 2006 census, its population was 613, in 132 families.

References 

Populated places in Dana County